Linwood Colonial Apartments, also known as Colonial Park Apartments, is a historic garden apartment complex and national historic district located at Indianapolis, Indiana.  It was built in 1937–1938, and consists of three three-story, Colonial Revival style red brick buildings.  It has 106 apartments and includes a "U"-shaped building and two stepped plan buildings.

It was listed on the National Register of Historic Places in 2006.

References

Apartment buildings in Indiana
Historic districts on the National Register of Historic Places in Indiana
Residential buildings on the National Register of Historic Places in Indiana
Colonial Revival architecture in Indiana
Residential buildings completed in 1938
Residential buildings in Indianapolis
Historic districts in Indianapolis
National Register of Historic Places in Indianapolis